Uznach railway station is a railway station situated in the municipality of Uznach in the Swiss canton of St. Gallen. It is located on the Wallisellen–Uster–Rapperswil railway line, at its junction with the Uznach to Wattwil line.

The station is served by the inter-regional Voralpen Express, which links Lucerne and St. Gallen via Rapperswil and Wattwil. It is also served St. Gallen S-Bahn service S4, which operates in both directions around a loop via Wattwil, St. Gallen, Sargans and Ziegelbrücke, and service S6, which links Rapperswil with Schwanden via Ziegelbrücke. All three trains run hourly, combining to provide half-hourly services to Rapperswil, St. Gallen and Ziegelbrücke.

Services 
 the following services stop at Uznach:

 St. Gallen S-Bahn:
 : hourly service via  and St. Gallen (circle route).

References

External links 
 
 

Railway stations in the canton of St. Gallen
Swiss Federal Railways stations